Blyton railway station is a former railway station in Blyton, Lincolnshire. It was on the (still open) line between Gainsborough and Grimsby.

References

Disused railway stations in Lincolnshire
Former Great Central Railway stations
Railway stations in Great Britain opened in 1849
Railway stations in Great Britain closed in 1959
1849 establishments in England